Wolfgang Paul (born 25 January 1940 in Olsberg, Province of Westphalia) is a German former football player.

Captaining Borussia Dortmund to the European Cup Winners Cup in 1966, Paul got included in Helmut Schön's West German squad for the 1966 FIFA World Cup. Despite this, the defender never played a match for West Germany and had to retire early because of the effects an injury picked up in the late 1960s had to his game.

Honours
 1966 FIFA World Cup runner-up
 UEFA Cup Winners' Cup winner: 1965–66
 Bundesliga runner-up: 1965–66
 DFB-Pokal winner: 1964–65
 DFB-Pokal finalist: 1962–63

References

1940 births
Living people
People from Hochsauerlandkreis
Sportspeople from Arnsberg (region)
People from the Province of Westphalia
German footballers
Borussia Dortmund players
Bundesliga players
1966 FIFA World Cup players
Association football defenders
Footballers from North Rhine-Westphalia
West German footballers